Radio Rebel is a 2012 teen drama television film  based on a novel titled Shrinking Violet. The movie premiered on Disney Channel in the United States on February 17, 2012 and YTV in Canada on March 9, 2012. The movie was produced by MarVista Entertainment and Two 4 Money Media, in association with YTV and Disney Channel. The movie was directed by Peter Howitt, written by Erik Patterson & Jessica Scott. It stars Debby Ryan, Merritt Patterson, Adam DiMarco, Sarena Parmar and Nancy Robertson. The film follows a shy girl (Ryan) who goes undercover with a radio persona that allows her to express her true feelings. Her identity is put at risk when her school principal (Robertson) threatens to expel the young girl following a life of mischief.

Plot
Tara Adams is a very shy student at Lincoln Bay High who secretly runs the most popular podcast in Seattle, Radio Rebel, unbeknownst to her friends Audrey, Larry, and Barry. One day at school, Audrey decides to confront Stacy, Tara's rival, by remembering one of Rebel's mottos. Stacy then proves her hatred of the group by having Principal Moreno confiscate Audrey's player. Meanwhile, Gabe and Gavin (AKA the G's, the school's internet sensation and local band) thank the student body for voting them to play prom, which Stacy praises, giving Gavin hope about asking her to prom due to her recent breakup with her long distance boyfriend. During drama class, Tara notices Gavin walk in, leading to her awkwardly walking out of the classroom due to her intense crush on him. Audrey convinces her otherwise, leading to Tara awkwardly embarrassing herself when asked to write a suggestion of a scene for the class assignment.

During one of Rebel's podcasts, Rob, Tara's step-dad who runs SlamFM, Seattle's biggest radio station, is suggested he listen to Rebel's podcast. Rob tries to get Tara's opinion on Rebel in hopes of bonding with her, ending with Tara's identity revealed to Rob and her mother Delilah. Tara is assigned drama projects with Stacy and Gavin and is also invited to Audrey's house to listen to Radio Rebel. Having been hired by Rob to host her podcast at SlamFM, Tara rebuffs Audrey, straining their relationship. The next day, Tara begins to second guess her job at SlamFM, but is inspired by another radio host, DJ Cami Q, whom she befriends. During her show, Tara confides in the viewers about change, and suggests they wear red the next day to express the feeling of unity despite being different. Due to Tara's frequent lies, Tara and Audrey's relationship is further strained, forcing Tara to reveal her secret identity to Audrey.

During drama rehearsals, Tara notices Gavin leave behind a demo of the G's, which she takes and plays during her next show;  she suggests everyone start dancing the next day in order to "let it all out". The plan backfires when Moreno threatens to expel anyone that is caught listening to Rebel.  On another occasion, Cami Q shows up at school with a recording of Rebel that states that she is taking back the music that Moreno took away. This leads to Moreno having to expel students withholding information regarding Rebel's identity. With only days left till prom, Rebel continues inspiring listeners until Tara finds out that Rebel was nominated for Prom Queen. Tara refuses to accept the crown in hopes of keeping her identity anonymous. Using a wig, Tara and Audrey secretly sneak into SlamFM while Larry and Barry continue their pursuit for Rebel. Rob confronts Tara about the confrontation at school and reveals that Moreno wants to expel Rebel as soon as she finds out her identity. During this, Tara persuades her viewers to confess their fears, resulting in Tara confessing her fear of revealing her true identity

When Rebel doesn't reveal herself to Moreno, Moreno decides to cancel the prom, angering the students of Lincoln Bay High. This causes Rebel's podcast to go downhill and many protests to be held outside of SlamFM. With the help of Cami, Tara and Audrey sneak inside and persuade their viewers to share their true feelings. After a montage of hateful reviews from callers, Tara comes up with a plan and uses a sandwich mascot as bait in order to escape unnoticed. The next day, Rebel uses a voice recording to announce the MORP (prom spelled backwards) in retaliation of the prom's cancellation. Stacy becomes suspicious when Tara recalls a moment between the two while listening to the show, leading to Stacy announcing a party at her home during Rebel's next broadcast. Knowing that if she didn't attend, her identity would be revealed, Tara decides to go to the party while Delilah and Cami use voice recordings to fill Tara's place. When the voice recordings go awry, Tara decides to answer Stacy's call from the party, by calling in to SlamFM, all while evading Stacy in Stacy's own home. Meanwhile, Stacy's personal assistant, Kim, gets proof that Tara is Rebel, although is spotted by Cami and Delilah on the way out.

On the day of the drama presentation, Gavin quits the G's when he becomes fed up with Gabe's pursuit of fame. Stacy locks Tara inside the janitor's closet to take her place in the love scene and threatens to release Kim's recording to the school. Tara then sponsor's Stacy's campaign in hopes of keeping the secret quiet. Gavin finds out about the closet and decides to reject Stacy's invitation to the Morp. On the day of the Morp, Moreno keeps an eye out for Rebel as Cami announces the Prom Queen. When Rebel is granted the title, Tara overcomes her fears and reveals herself as Radio Rebel. When Moreno decides to expel Tara, Audrey then declares she is Radio Rebel followed by the entire crowd. Unable to expel the entire student body, Moreno reluctantly gives up and storms off in defeat. Tara then decides to hand Stacy the crown, knowing how much it meant to her and the two end their rivalry as Stacy becomes a supporter of Radio Rebel. As the crowd cheers, Gavin heads up on stage and sings a song dedicated to Tara. Gavin then dances with Tara and surprisingly kisses her on the cheek.

Cast
 Debby Ryan as Tara Adams, a shy schoolgirl who secretly adopts the radio personality Radio Rebel.
 Merritt Patterson as Stacy DeBane, the school's queen bee and mean girl who is obsessed with being the Prom Queen.
 Adam DiMarco as Gavin, a member of The G's and Stacy's former prom date who is Tara's love interest.
 Sarena Parmar as Audrey Sharma, Tara's best friend who helps hide her secret identity.
 Nancy Robertson as Principal Moreno.
 Allie Bertram as Kim, Stacy's best friend.
 Mercedes de la Zerda as DJ Cami Q, the popular radio DJ who is Tara's good friend at SLAM FM.
 Atticus Mitchell as Gabe, an ambitious wannabe rockstar, lead singer of the band The Gs. 
 Martin Cummins as Rob Lynch-Adams, Tara's stepfather who runs SLAM FM.
 April Telek as Delilah Adams, Tara's mother.
 Iain Belcher as Barry, one of Tara's best friends and Larry's twin.
 Rowen Kahn as Larry,  one of Tara's best friends and Barry's twin.

Production
When Shrinking Violet was adapted into a movie, certain elements were altered, including the character Teresa being renamed Tara and her radio personality being changed from Sweet T to Radio Rebel.

The movie was directed by Peter Howitt and was shot in Canada, with principal photography taking place during the summer of 2011 in Vancouver. The scenes in the school, and some scenes at "SlamFM," were filmed at Meadowridge Independent School in Maple Ridge, British Columbia. The script was written by Erik Patterson and Jessica Scott. Michael Jacobs, Robyn Snyder and MarVista CEO Fernando Szew executive produced the film with Kim Arnott and Oliver De Caigny. "We are confident that 'Radio Rebel' features the same elements that made our first production a huge success including a tight, fast-paced and comedic script and an all-around talented cast, plus several original songs that will be sure to delight teens across the globe," Szew explained.

Debby Ryan recorded two songs to promote the film: a cover of The Go-Go's' "We Got the Beat" and a collaboration with Chase Ryan and Chad Hively called "We Ended Right".

Promotion
The movie was accompanied by a week-long lineup called We Got the Beat Week consisting of new music videos and music-themed Disney Channel series and movies.

Soundtrack

The Radio Rebel soundtrack album was released on February 21, 2012 by Walt Disney Records.

Track listing

Reception
The movie earned 4.3 million viewers on its premiere night.

Broadcast
The film aired on Disney Channel in the United States on February 17, 2012. It premiered on March 9, 2012 in Canada on YTV, on June 1, 2012 on Disney Channel UK and Ireland, on June 17, 2012 on Disney Channel Asia, on July 6, 2012 on Disney Channel Australia, and on June 16, 2013 on Disney Channel South Africa.

References

Further reading

External links

 
 Who is Radio Rebel?

2012 soundtrack albums
2012 television films
2012 films
English-language Canadian films
American teen comedy films
American comedy television films
Canadian comedy television films
Films about radio people
Films based on American novels
Films directed by Peter Howitt
Canadian teen films
2010s teen comedy-drama films
Films set in Seattle
Films shot in Vancouver
Drama film soundtracks
2010s American films
2010s Canadian films